Metius canotae is a species of ground beetle in the subfamily Pterostichinae. It was described by Steinheil in 1869.

References

Metius (genus)
Beetles described in 1869